WFYL (1180 AM) is a daytime-only radio station broadcasting a news–talk format. Licensed to King of Prussia, Pennsylvania, United States, the station is owned by Alan and Susan Loch, through licensee Trinity Associates Broadcasting, LLC. Its Valcom whip antenna and transmitter are located in Jeffersonville in the Jeffersonville Golf Club.

As a daytime only station, its frequency is occupied by WHAM from Rochester, New York, in the evenings.

References

External links
 

FYL
News and talk radio stations in the United States
Montgomery County, Pennsylvania
Radio stations established in 1976
1976 establishments in Pennsylvania
FYL